Lualabaea is an extinct genus of prehistoric coelacanth, belonging to the family Mawsoniidae, containing the single species L. lerichei. It has been found in Late Jurassic or Berriasian aged deposits in the Democratic Republic of the Congo.

See also

 Sarcopterygii
 List of sarcopterygians
 List of prehistoric bony fish

References

Prehistoric lobe-finned fish genera